Megalopyge immaculata is a moth of the family Megalopygidae. It was described by Samuel E. Cassino in 1928.

References

Moths described in 1928
Megalopygidae